Nir Akiva (lit. Akiva's Meadow) is a moshav in southern Israel. Located in the north-western Negev near Netivot and Nir Moshe and covering 1,000 dunams, it falls under the jurisdiction of Merhavim Regional Council.

History
The moshav was established in 1953 on land that had belonged to the Palestinian village of Kawfakha. It was named after Akiva Etinger, a chief of the Settlement Department in the Jewish Agency. In the late 1970s Amir Peretz was a member of the moshav.

References

External links
Nir Akiva Negev Information Centre

Moshavim
Populated places established in 1953
Populated places in Southern District (Israel)
1953 establishments in Israel